The Asus P535 is a high performance Pocket PC(PPC) that was designed for business managers. It was launched by ASUSTeK Computer Inc. in November, 2006. At first, the Asus P535 ran with Microsoft(R) Window Mobile 5.0. However, it is upgradable to Microsoft(R) Windows mobile 6.5.

Network & Communication 

For connectivity, the Asus P535 uses a 2G tri-band (GSM900/1800/1900 MHz) network, so 3G and Edge are not supported. However this device still can connect by WLAN (WiFi 802.11b+g).

Processor and Memory 

The Asus P535 uses Intel Xscale(R) 520-MHz CPU, which was leading CPU-chip set in 2006. Users can switch the CPU mode to Power Saving, Standard, or Turbo. The PPC was released with the 64 MB of SDRAM and can support up to 128 MB of SDRAM.

Features 

The Asus P535 has 2.0 megapixel Auto Focus(AF) camera with LED flash, macro mode, and video mode. The device was one of the first PPCs to uses a TFT resistive touchscreen. The screen has a size of 240x320 pixels with 65,536 colors. There is a Li-Ion battery of 1300 mAh capacity.

At the time, the Asus P535 provided advanced communication functions and had a high performance CPU. However, the fast CPU caused an amount of energy drain which resulted in a shorter battery life than other contemporary PPC devices.

References

 
 
Radio-frequency identification
Personal computers

tr:Cep bilgisayarı#Pocket PC